The American Society of Interventional Pain Physicians (ASIPP) is a not-for-profit organization that represents nearly 4,500 interventional pain management specialists.  It has its headquarters in Paducah, Kentucky. Its current Chairman of the Board and Chief Executive Officer is Laxmaiah Manchikanti, MD and its current president is Amol Soin, MD. President Elect is Sheri Albers, DO.

Founding

ASIPP was founded by Laxmaiah Manchikanti, MD in 1998. Originally called the Association of Pain Management Anesthesiologists, the name was changed in 1999 to include other medical specialties that practice interventional pain management.

Mission statement and goals

ASIPP's Mission Statement is, "To promote the development and practice of safe, high quality, cost-effective interventional pain management techniques for the diagnosis and treatment of pain and related disorders, and to ensure patient access to these interventions."

ASIPP's listed goals are to preserve coverage for interventional pain management; to advance patient safety, cost effectiveness, and accountability; to provide state of the art interventional pain management services; to communicate with legislators, patients, the public, the Centers for Medicare and Medicaid Services, and third party payers; to uphold high principles, policies, and practices; to pursue excellence in education in interventional pain management; to improve practice management; to improve compliance; to eliminate fraud and abuse; to provide the best possible interventional pain management.

Educational activities

ASIPP sponsors and conducts educational activities related to basic, intermediate, and advanced interventional pain management procedures, regenerative medicine techniques, spinal endoscopic decompression, and neuromodulation techniques. ASIPP's comprehensive cadaver workshops give physicians hands-on training in these procedures. Other educational courses conducted by ASIPP include comprehensive reviews in interventional pain management, Pain Medicine, regenerative medicine; comprehensive reviews in controlled substance management as well as coding, compliance, and practice management; neuromodulation and spinal endoscopic decompression, and courses in fluoroscopy and radiation safety. These activities grant physicians Continuing Medical Education credits and Continuing Education credits for nonphysicians.

Through a sister organization, the American Board of Interventional Pain Physicians (ABIPP), offers board certification in interventional pain management. ABIPP also offers competency certifications in interventional pain management, controlled substance management; coding, compliance, and practice management; and fluoroscopic interpretation and radiological safety, regenerative medicine, and spinal endoscopic decompression.

The Annual Meeting features world-renowned speakers on interventional pain management and public health policy. The General Session includes the Raj-Racz Distinguished Lecture Series in honor of Phulchand Prithvi Raj and Gabor Racz and Manchikanti Distinguished Lecture.

Publications

Through ASIPP Publishing, ASIPP publishes Pain Physician, a bimonthly peer-reviewed journal. It is indexed and included on Excerpta Medica, EMBASE, Medline, PubMed, and Index Medicus. The journal has a print component as well as online content. All content, including print, is freely available online at the Pain Physician website. The journal features medically related manuscripts and articles on public health policy.

Books published by ASIPP Publishing include Essentials of Regenerative Medicine in Interventional Pain Management, Essentials of Interventional Techniques in Managing Chronic Spinal Pain, Interventional Techniques in Chronic Non-spinal Pain For Interventional Pain Physicians; Interventional Techniques in Chronic Spinal Pain For Interventional Pain Physicians; Essentials of Practice Management: Billing, Coding, and Compliance in Interventional Pain Management; Low Back Pain: Diagnosis and Treatment; Foundations; Clinical Aspects; Board Review Self-assessment.

ASIPP publishes comprehensive evidence-based guidelines. Current guidelines are:
 Manchikanti L, Knezevic NN, Navani A, et al. Epidural interventions in the management of chronic spinal pain: American Society of Interventional Pain Physicians (ASIPP) comprehensive evidence-based guidelines. Pain Physician 2021; 24:S27-S208.
 Manchikanti L, Kaye AD, Soin A, et al. Comprehensive evidence-based guidelines for facet joint interventions in the management of chronic spinal pain: American Society of Interventional Pain Physicians (ASIPP) guidelines. Pain Physician 2020; 23:S1-S127.
 Shah S, Diwan S, Soin A, et al. Evidence-based risk mitigation and stratification during COVID-19 for return to interventional pain practice: American Society of Interventional Pain Physicians (ASIPP) Guidelines. Pain Physician 2020; 23:S161-S182.
 Gharibo C, Sharma A, Soin A, et al. Triaging interventional pain procedures during COVID-19 or related elective surgery restrictions: evidence-informed guidance from the American Society of Interventional Pain Physicians (ASIPP). Pain Physician 2020; 23:S183-S204.
 Manchikanti L, Centeno CJ, Atluri S, et al. Bone marrow concentrate (BMC) therapy in musculoskeletal disorders: Evidence-based policy position statement of American Society of Interventional Pain Physicians (ASIPP). Pain Physician 2020; 23:E85-E131.
 Navani A, Manchikanti L, Albers SL, et al. Responsible, safe, and effective use of biologics in the management of low back pain: American Society of Interventional Pain Physicians (ASIPP) guidelines. Pain Physician 2019; 22:S1-S74.
 Kaye AD, Manchikanti L, Novitch MB, et al. Responsible, safe, and effective use of antithrombotics and anticoagulants in patients undergoing interventional techniques: American Society of Interventional Pain Physicians (ASIPP) guidelines. Pain Physician 2019; 22:S75-S128.
 Manchikanti L, Kaye AM, Knezevic NN, et al. Responsible, safe, and effective prescription of opioids for chronic non-cancer pain: American Society of Interventional Pain Physicians (ASIPP) guidelines. Pain Physician 2017; 20: S3-S92.
 Manchikanti L, Abdi S, Atluri S, et al. An update of comprehensive evidence-based guidelines for interventional techniques of chronic spinal pain: Part II: Guidance and recommendations. Pain Physician 2013; 16:S49-S283.

Advocacy

Through its political action committee, ASIPP promotes interventional pain management and contributes to the dialogue on public health. ASIPP was instrumental in having interventional pain management recognized as a medical specialty with its own specialty designation (09). ASIPP also achieved membership on Medicare Carrier Advisory Committees for interventional pain management. Interventional pain management practitioners have also benefited from the payment codes supported by ASIPP for interventional pain procedures.

ASIPP's major political achievement was passage of the National All Schedules Prescription Electronic Reporting (NASPER) Act. Signed into law by President Bush on August 11, 2005, this legislation helps control the diversion and abuse of prescription medication. NASPER is designed to protect patients and physicians from the harmful effects of controlled substances through their misuse and abuse. No physician organization had ever originated a law before NASPER.

References

Further reading

External links
 American Society of Interventional Pain Physicians
 American Board of Interventional Pain Physicians
 Pain Physician (journal)

Medical associations based in the United States
Non-profit organizations based in Kentucky
Pain management
1998 establishments in Kentucky
Paducah, Kentucky
Organizations established in 1998
Medical and health organizations based in Kentucky